Valter Guchua (born 6 June 1975) is a Georgian footballer who plays for FC Baia Zugdidi.

Guchua played for FC Samtredia in UEFA Cup 1995-96, FC Dinamo Tbilisi in UEFA Champions League 1998-99, FC Torpedo Kutaisi in UEFA Champions League 2002-03, Sioni Bolnisi in UEFA Cup 2003-04.

He made his Georgia debut on 24 April 1996, against Romania on friendly.

External links

1975 births
Association football defenders
Expatriate footballers in Iran
Expatriate footballers in Ukraine
FC Zugdidi players
FC Dinamo Tbilisi players
FC Samtredia players
Footballers from Georgia (country)
Expatriate footballers from Georgia (country)
Georgia (country) international footballers
Living people
Saba players